Nancy Ann Olson (born July 14, 1928) is an American retired actress. She was nominated for an Academy Award for Best Supporting Actress for her role in Sunset Boulevard (1950). She co-starred with William Holden in four films, and later appeared in The Absent-Minded Professor (1961) and its sequel, Son of Flubber (1963), as well as the disaster film Airport 1975 (1974). Olson  retired from acting in the 
mid-1980s, although she has made a few rare returns, most recently in 2014.

Early life
Olson was born in Milwaukee, Wisconsin on July 14, 1928, the daughter of Evelyn Bertha (née Bergstrom), who was of Swedish descent, and Henry John Olson, who was a physician. She has a brother, David.

Career
Olson was signed to a film contract by Paramount Pictures in 1948, and, after a few supporting roles, producers began to consider her for more prominent parts. She was up for the role of Delilah in Cecil B. DeMille's film Samson and Delilah (1949), for which Olson later said she was not suited. She was passed over in favor of Hedy Lamarr. Her first big role came in Canadian Pacific (also 1949) with Randolph Scott, then Billy Wilder cast her for his upcoming project. In Sunset Boulevard (1950), she played Betty Schaefer, for which she gained an Academy Award nomination for Best Supporting Actress. Her pairing with William Holden was considered a success, and she appeared with him in three other films (Union Station, Force of Arms, and Submarine Command, the second and third released the following year), but none repeated their success in Sunset Boulevard. Other film credits include Big Jim McLain (1952), So Big (1953), Battle Cry (1955), and Dumbbells (2014).

Olson made several appearances in films for the Walt Disney studio. The Absent-Minded Professor (1961) and Son of Flubber (1963) paired her with Fred MacMurray and were popular with movie-goers. She also appeared alongside Hayley Mills in Pollyanna (1960) and Dean Jones in Snowball Express (1972). Olson then moved to New York City where she appeared on Broadway.

Throughout the 1960s and 1970s, she did guest roles on television. Olson guest-starred on the Television series The Big Valley playing the mother of Ron Howard in the December 1, 1965, episode entitled Night of the Wolf. Olson is the only female guest starring on The Big Valley to ever marry the character Nick Barkley. Olson has been retired since the mid-1980s, although she made a brief, uncredited appearance in Flubber, the 1997 remake of The Absent-Minded Professor.

Personal life
In 1950, Olson became the third wife of lyricist Alan Jay Lerner. They had two daughters, Liza and Jennifer. They divorced in 1957.

In 1962, she married long-time Capitol Records executive Alan W. Livingston, best known for creating Bozo the Clown and for signing Frank Sinatra, Judy Garland and other singers to Capitol. He died in 2009; they had one son, Christopher.

Olson is a registered Democrat, and over the years, she has made several monetary donations to the party under her married name.

Filmography

Film

Television

References

External links

 
 
 Interview with Nancy Olson Livingston at Classic Film & TV Cafe, 5 September 2022

1928 births
Living people
American film actresses
American people of Swedish descent
American stage actresses
Actresses from Milwaukee
20th-century American actresses
Paramount Pictures contract players
California Democrats
Wisconsin Democrats
21st-century American women